Jorge Rodríguez Esquivel (born 18 April 1968) is a Mexican former professional footballer, who played for Toluca and Santos Laguna. He also represented Mexico at the 1994 FIFA World Cup.

External links

playerhistory

1968 births
Living people
Mexican footballers
Deportivo Toluca F.C. players
Santos Laguna footballers
Mexico international footballers
CONCACAF Gold Cup-winning players
1993 CONCACAF Gold Cup players
1994 FIFA World Cup players
1995 King Fahd Cup players
1995 Copa América players
People from Toluca
Footballers from the State of Mexico
Association football midfielders
Liga MX players